Joi Cardwell is the eponymous second studio album by American singer Joi Cardwell. It was released on November 11, 1997, by Eightball Records in collaboration with WEA's Lightyear Entertainment. Most of the lyrical content of the album was inspired by Cardwell's personal life.

Upon its release, Joi Cardwell received generally positive reviews from most music critics. It was also successful in international music markets and yielded four singles, including four commercial hits: "Soul to Bare", "Run to You", "Found Love" and "Power".

Recording and production
Cardwell began her second album in mid-1996. The album was at four different recording studios in New York City including Big Screen Studios, Fusion Studios, Num Sound Studios, and Gomi's Lair Productions. Cardwell decided to enlist in recording and writing with more producers and taking a slightly lesser production than she did on her debut album. Producers Phillip Damien, Hani Al-Bader, Bluejean, Frankie Knuckles, Brinsley Evans each contributed tracks and mixes, while Cardwell also self-produced several songs. The songs were mastered and engineered by Konrad Carelli and Gerald Freeman in New York City.

Joi Cardwell was influenced by a variety of American genres, and, like Cardwell's previous album, incorporated urban contemporary elements including contemporary R&B and jazz. Cardwell crafted most songs on the album through live instrumentation and diverse techniques. This is evident on "Stop & Think", which utilizes bass guitar, drums, keyboard, and different percussion instruments.

Release and promotion
After the success of her previous album, Eightball Records decided to partner with WEA's Lightyear Entertainment to distribute Joi Cardwell. The album was released on November 11, 1997 in North America. Cardwell, who had toured throughout the year of 1997, decided to briefly concluded to cope with the untimely death of her mother Jacqueline Cardwell; who died of metastatic breast cancer.

"Soul to Bare", produced in collaboration with Hani Al-Bader, was released on February 3, 1997, as the album's lead single. The song peaked in the top-two on Billboard's Hot Dance Music/Club Play. "Run to You" was released on November 25. It became her second solo highest-charting single, opening at number forty-four on the Billboard Club Play chart;
 ultimately peaking at number 1 for two weeks.

The album's third single "Found Love" was released on October 12, 1998, as the third single. Produced by Frankie Knuckles, the song was described as more romantic in comparison to her previous single releases. "Found Love" peaked at number five on the Club Play chart. "Power", the album's final single, was released on November 23, 1998. Along with the release of each single, remix EPs were released.

Critical reception
Joi Cardwell received generally positive reviews from music critics. Paul Verna of Billboard magazine gave a nod to Cardwell by saying, "As the set's dominant producer and songwriter, Cardwell scores equally high marks in both roles." AllMusic gave the album three out of five stars. Barry Walters of The Advocate highlights the album's tone and timbre as particularly emotional and honest in lyrical content, stating "Cardwell refines the rawness of her debut while maintaining its emotional honesty. Joi Cardwell is much more lush and club-ready."

Track listing

Personnel

 Joi Cardwell – lead vocals (All tracks), backing vocals (tracks 1-12), producer, executive producer, songwriting (1-12)
 Hani Al-Bader – producer, programming, engineer, co-writer
 Sandy Barber – background vocals
 Bluejean – producer, engineer 
 Atelier³ D Thom Bissett – graphic artist
 Konrad Carelli – engineer
 David Carlucci – producer
 Patrick Carvajal – mixer
 Mayra Casalas – percussion
 Fred Cash – bass
 Jon Creamer – drums
 DJ Mike Cruz – producer
 Phillip Damien – producer
 Dahoud Darien – producer
 Yancy Drew – drums
 Gerald Freeman – engineer
 Lee Genesis – background vocals
 Kazuhiko Gomi – programming, producer
 Richie Goods – bass

 Hex Hector – producer (track 11)
 Matthias Heilbronn – engineer
 Stephanie James – background vocals
 Alex Kaplan – executive producer
 Frankie Knuckles – producer, mixer, songwriter
 Dah Len – photography
 Danny Madden – vocal production
 Marina Maaricic  – Hair & Makeup
 Shedrick Mitchell – organ
 Cindy Mizelle – background vocals
 Laurie Padilla – background vocals
 James 'Sleepy Keys' Preston – piano
 Peter Schwartz – keyboards, songwriting
 E. Smoove – vocal production
 Dave "EQ" Sussman – engineer
 Satoshi Tomiie – programming
 Willy Washington – songwriting
 Audrey Wheeler – background vocals
 Kevin Williams – A&R

References

External links
 

1997 albums
Joi Cardwell albums